PASD may refer to:

 Pinconning Area School District
 Progressive Alliance of Socialists and Democrats
 Phoenixville Area School District
 PAS diastase
 Sand Point Airport (ICAO location indicator: PASD), in Sand Point, Alaska, United States